Martine Soffiatti Grael (born 12 February 1991) is a Brazilian sailor in the 49er FX class. Together with Kahena Kunze she won the 49er FX class at the 2014 ISAF Sailing World Championships and at the 2016 Rio Olympics, and 2020 Tokyo Olympics.

Career 
Martine Grael is the daughter of Olympic gold medalist in sailing Torben Grael. Her brother Marco and uncle Lars also sailed in the Olympics.

She sailed with Team AkzoNobel in the 2017–18 Volvo Ocean Race.

Achievements

Notes

References

External links

 

1991 births
Living people
Brazilian female sailors (sport)
Sportspeople from Niterói
420 class sailors
470 class sailors
49er FX class world champions
ISAF World Sailor of the Year (female)
Volvo Ocean Race sailors
World champions in sailing for Brazil
Olympic sailors of Brazil
Olympic gold medalists for Brazil
Olympic medalists in sailing
Sailors at the 2016 Summer Olympics – 49er FX
Sailors at the 2020 Summer Olympics – 49er FX
Medalists at the 2016 Summer Olympics
Medalists at the 2020 Summer Olympics
Pan American Games silver medalists for Brazil
Pan American Games medalists in sailing
Sailors at the 2015 Pan American Games
Sailors at the 2019 Pan American Games
Medalists at the 2015 Pan American Games
Medalists at the 2019 Pan American Games
Universiade medalists in sailing
Universiade bronze medalists for Brazil
Medalists at the 2011 Summer Universiade
Martine Grael
21st-century Brazilian women